The 10th International 500-Mile Sweepstakes Race was held at the Indianapolis Motor Speedway on Tuesday, May 30, 1922.

Jimmy Murphy is the first driver to win the race from the pole position. He was accompanied by riding mechanic Ernie Olson.

Time trials
Four-lap (10 mile) qualifying runs were utilized.

Results

Race details
For 1922, riding mechanics were required.
First alternate: none

References

Indianapolis 500 races
Indianapolis 500
Indianapolis 500
1922 in American motorsport
May 1922 sports events